Ivan Samosenko (1894–1920) was a Ukrainian military leader and a war criminal who was involved in anti-Jewish pogroms in Ukraine for which he was executed. However, some sources say that he was released.

Before joining the Ukrainian Army, Samosenko served in the Russian Imperial Army, holding a rank of praporshchik.

In 1917 he joined the newly formed Ukrainian detachment of the Russian Republic, the 2nd Ukrainian Cossack Regiment of Hetman Polubotok.

In November 1918, in Lubny, he gathered a guerilla detachment in a fight against the Hetman administration. In January 1919 his detachment moved to Right-bank Ukraine, where it was transformed in the "Zaporizhian Brigade named after Symon Petlura" which consisted of two kurins (battalions). After suffering a defeat at frontlines in March 1919, remnants of the brigade in May 1919 were transferred to the Zaporizhian Corpus of the Standing Army of the Ukrainian People's Republic  (Ukrainian People's Army).

On 1 May 1919 Samosenko was arrested and was under investigation on charges of organizing Jewish pogroms. In October 1919 he was freed from jail in Kamianets-Podilskyi by military detachments of the Armed Forces of South Russia that occupied the city.

On 17 January 1920 Samosenko was a military commissar and commander of the Red Insurgent Forces of Bratslav County. In April 1920 he joined the 2nd Division (later the 3rd Iron Division) of Ukrainian People's Army, but soon it was discovered that he was under investigation. After his attempt to flee, Samosenko was arrested by the Polish police at the Czechoslovakian border and handed over to the Ukrainian authorities. Eventually he was executed on charges of organizing Jewish pogroms.

See also
 Proskurov pogrom

References

External links
 Ivan Samosenko. brief overview.

1894 births
1920 deaths
Ukrainian military leaders
Ukrainian people of World War I
Russian military personnel of World War I
Ukrainian people convicted of war crimes
People executed for war crimes